Montes Claros/Mário Ribeiro Airport  is the airport serving Montes Claros, Brazil.

During a transitional period, the airport is jointly operated by Infraero and AENA.

History
The airport was commissioned in 1939.

Since 1980 it is managed by Infraero.

Previously operated by Infraero, on August 18, 2022 the consortium AENA won a 30-year concession to operate the airport.

Airlines and destinations

Access

See also

List of airports in Brazil

References

External links

Airports in Minas Gerais
Airports established in 1939